Khālid ibn Saʿīd ibn al-ʿĀṣ (d. 634 CE), also known as Abu Sa'id, was a companion to the Islamic prophet Muhammad and a general under the Rashidun Caliphate.

He was one of the members of Banu Umayya of the Quraysh tribe. Khalid converted to Islam before 613 CE along with his brother Amr. He migrated to Abyssinia along with his wife Hamaniya, where he acted as Umm Habiba's wali when she married Muhammad while she was in Abyssinia.

In 633, he was appointed commander of Syrian campaign by Abu Bakr. In 634, he married Umm Hakim bint al-Harith ibn Hisham on the evening preceding battle of Marj al-Saffar, he was killed in the battle.

References

Banu Umayya
Muhajirun
634 deaths
Arab people of the Arab–Byzantine wars
People of the Muslim conquest of the Levant
Generals of the Rashidun Caliphate
Companions of the Prophet